María Luisa Terán de Weiss (29 January 1918 – 8 December 1984), known in Argentina as Mary Terán de Weiss, and out of Argentina as María Teran Weiss, was a tennis player, the first Argentine woman to have a relevant sport performance in the international tennis tour.

Tennis career
She played between 1938 and 1959, and was considered a top 20 player, winning the Irish Open (1950), Israel International (1950), Cologne International (1951), Baden-Baden (1951) and Welsh International (1954), and several times the Rio de la Plata Championship. In 1948, she reached quarterfinals at the French Open and won the All England Plate, a tennis competition held at the Wimbledon Championships that consisted of players who were defeated in the first or second rounds of the singles competition. She also won two gold and bronze medals at the 1951 Pan American Games.

Political persecution in Argentina
Mary Terán was persecuted by the military dictatorship, which came to power in 1955, because of her sympathy and identification with the Peronist Movement, forcing her into exile in Spain and Uruguay and to retire from tennis at the end of the 1950s, and excluding her from all recognition by the press and sport organizations.

Until the 1980s, Argentina's tennis was a sport for the upper classes. Mary Terán confronted the leaders of the Argentine Tennis Association, with the goal of promoting tennis among common people. In the early 1980s, she organized a campaign to support Guillermo Vilas and help to spread tennis in the country when the Argentine Tennis Association was campaigning against Vilas.

Death and legacy
After the return of democracy to Argentina at the end of 1983, she continued to be ignored by the media and the government. A few months later, she committed suicide by jumping from the seventh floor of a building in the city of Mar del Plata at the age of 66.

In 2007, the City of Buenos Aires honoured her by naming the new tennis stadium of the city Estadio Mary Terán de Weiss.

Personal life
She was married to fellow tennis player Heraldo Weiss. He died in 1952.

See also
 Sports in Argentina
 Tennis in Argentina
 Peronismo

Sources

References

Books 
Lupo, Víctor F. (2004). Historia política del deporte argentino, Buenos Aires: Corregidor, capítulo XXXIV

External links

Búsico, Jorge (09-12-2004), Mary Terán de Weiss, la mujer y la memoria, Clarín. (In Spanish)
Rodríguez, Tomás (08-12-2008). La historia trágica de una grande: María Luisa Terán de Weiss, El Litoral.(In Spanish)

1918 births
1984 suicides
Sportspeople from Rosario, Santa Fe
Argentine female tennis players
Pan American Games medalists in tennis
Suicides by jumping in Argentina
Argentine exiles
Pan American Games gold medalists for Argentina
Pan American Games bronze medalists for Argentina
Tennis players at the 1951 Pan American Games
Tennis players at the 1955 Pan American Games
Medalists at the 1951 Pan American Games
1984 deaths